Alfred James Rolfe (20 December 1870 – 19 December 1941) was an Englishman who emigrated to Australia to pursue a career as a cleric and teacher, becoming headmaster of Malvern School in Sydney.

Rolfe was one of seven siblings, the youngest son of James Rolfe and his wife Ellen Pilcher. His father's piano business was not prospering and, in 1879, he arranged for Rolfe to be "clothed" at Christ's Hospital. Rolfe left the school in 1887 and began his studies for the Anglican ministry. In 1889 he emigrated to Australia, where in 1893 he was ordained a deacon for the Diocese of Newcastle. The following year, however, he was suspended from his ministry by the bishop for reasons which remain unclear. He turned to schoolmastering, for which he quickly demonstrated a remarkable aptitude  He taught in Parkes in rural New South Wales, and in 1897 founded his own small school in Bega, where he met and married Beatrice Ashdown in 1898. The marriage was a happy one  and the couple had five children.

In 1904, Rolfe began a nine-year stint as headmaster of Wolaroi Grammar, now Kinross Wolaroi School, in Orange. In 1908 he was at last ordained to the Anglican priesthood. After a time at St Peter's College in Adelaide, he became acting headmaster of Barker College in Sydney before founding his own school, Malvern School, in Hunters Hill, again in Sydney. He was headmaster of Malvern from 1915 until his death in 1941.

One of Rolfe's elder brothers was the writer Frederick Rolfe, who corresponded regularly with his younger brother and the principal protagonist of whose novel The Desire and Pursuit of the Whole is represented as having written a novel named Sebastian Archer, based on Alfred Rolfe's life in Australia.

References 
 Frederick Rolfe, The Desire and Pursuit of the Whole: A Romance of Modern Venice, Cassell, 1934, p. 156.
 Robert Scoble, Alfred James Rolfe: The Real Sebastian Archer, Callum James, 2006.

Australian schoolteachers
English emigrants to Australia
1870 births
1941 deaths
People educated at Christ's Hospital